Saca or SACA may refer to:

Geography
Šaca, a borough in Slovakia
Saca Peak, Gurghiu Mountains, Mureș County, Romania
Saca (river), Suceava County, Romania
Saca, a village in Budureasa Commune, Bihor County, Romania
Saca, a village in Ghelăuza Commune, Strășeni district, Moldova
 Saca, a place mentioned in Kharoshthi documents that has been identified with Endere, an archaeological site in the southern Taklamakan Desert

SACA
South Australian Chess Association
South Australian Cricket Association
Singapore Amateur Cycling Association
SACA, Singapore After-Care Association
Southern Alberta Curling Association, the regional governing body for the sport of curling in Southern Alberta prior to 2018
Southern Arizona Community Academy, a school in Tucson, Arizona, United States
Southwest Atlanta Christian Academy, a school in Georgia, United States
ICAO airport code for Capitán Omar Darío Gerardi Airport, a military airport in Córdoba, Argentina

People
Saca (born 2003), American singer-songwriter
Antonio Saca (born 1965), former president of El Salvador
Serafim Saca (1935-2011), Moldovan writer

Other uses
FK Šaca, a Slovakian association football club
, a Spanish term for the process of extraction of convicts from prison and their subsequent irregular killings, particularly during the Spanish Civil War.

See also
Saka (disambiguation)